Batakachaur is a village development committee in Baglung District in the Dhaulagiri Zone of central Nepal. At the time of the 1991 Nepal census it had a population of 4,142 and had 794 houses in the village.

The town is predominantly Hindu but in 1991, 122 Buddhists registered in the town.

References

Populated places in Baglung District